Kasi Yathirai is a 1973 Indian Tamil-language romantic comedy film, directed by S. P. Muthuraman and written by V. C. Guhanathan. Soundtrack was composed by Shankar–Ganesh. The film stars V. K. Ramasamy, Srikanth and Suruli Rajan with Kumari Padmini, Jaya, Manorama (in dual role), M. R. R. Vasu and Cho Ramaswamy in supporting roles. Kamal Haasan worked under Thangappan as his dance assistant in this film. It was released on 10 June 1973, and ran for over 100 days in theatres.

Plot 

Paramasivam Pillai (V. K. Ramasamy) is an unmarried Hanuman devotee that insists on his niece Uma (Kumari Padmini) and nephew Ramu (Srikanth) also remaining unmarried. Ramu is in love with Seetha (Jaya) but is too cowed by his uncle to marry her. His friend Shankar (Suruli Rajan) enters their home posing as a Hanuman devotee to try to change Paramasivam's mind. A oddball cast of characters, including drama actress Andal (Manorama), her brother Mayandi (M. R. R. Vasu), Jaya's uncle Chokkalingam (Cho Ramaswamy) and more get pulled into Shankar's plans creating comedic chaos.

Cast 
Actors
V. K. Ramasamy as Paramasivam Pillai
 Cho Ramaswamy as Chokkalingam
 Srikanth as Ramu
 Suruli Rajan as Shankar
 Thengai Srinivasan as Kanthasamy
 M. R. R. Vasu as Mayandi
 Appalachari as Markandeyan Shastri
 ISR as Munniyappan Paramasivam Pillai's Assistant
 Typist Gopu as Kattakula Swamyji

Actresses
 Manorama as Andal/Lalitha
 Jaya as Seetha
 Kumari Padmini as Uma
 Gandhimathi as Parvathi

Soundtrack 
Music was composed by Shankar–Ganesh and lyrics were written by Vaali and Panchu Arunachalam.

References

External links 
 

1973 romantic comedy films
1970s Tamil-language films
1973 films
Films directed by S. P. Muthuraman
Films scored by Shankar–Ganesh
Films with screenplays by V. C. Guhanathan
Indian black-and-white films
Indian romantic comedy films